Juan José Menéndez Gutiérrez de la Torre (15 May 1929 – 7 November 2003) better known as Juanjo Menéndez was a Spanish actor. He appeared in more than 90 films and television shows between 1953 and 1997. He starred in the film El Lazarillo de Tormes, which won the Golden Bear at the 10th Berlin International Film Festival.

Selected filmography
 Gypsy Curse (1953)
 Two Paths (1954)
 It Happened in Seville (1955)
 Historias de la radio (1955)
 El Lazarillo de Tormes (1959)
 A Nearly Decent Girl (1963)
 Sor Citroën (1967)
 Fruit of Temptation (1968)

References

External links

1929 births
2003 deaths
Spanish male film actors
Male actors from Madrid
Deaths from dementia in Spain
Deaths from Alzheimer's disease